The brazen bull, also known as the bronze bull, Sicilian bull, or bull of Phalaris, was a torture and execution device designed in ancient Greece. According to Diodorus Siculus, recounting the story in Bibliotheca historica, Perilaus (or Perillus) of Athens invented and proposed it to Phalaris, the tyrant of Akragas, Sicily, as a new means of executing criminals. The bull was said to be hollow and made entirely out of bronze with a door in one side. According to legends, the brazen bull was designed in the form and size of an actual bull and had an acoustic apparatus that converted screams into the sound of a bull. The condemned were locked inside the device, and a fire was set under it, heating the metal until the person inside was roasted to death. Pindar, who lived less than a century afterwards, expressly associates this instrument of torture with the name of the tyrant Phalaris.

Creation of the brazen bull for Phalaris

The head of the bull was designed with a system of tubes and stops so that the prisoner's screams were converted into sounds like the bellowing of an infuriated bull. Phalaris is said to have commanded that the bull be designed in such a way that its smoke rose in spicy clouds of incense. According to legend, when the bull was reopened after a body was charred, the victim's scorched bones then "shone like jewels and were made into bracelets."

Stories allege after finishing construction on the execution device, Perilaus said to Phalaris: "His screams will come to you through the pipes as the tenderest, most pathetic, most melodious of bellowings." Perilaus believed he would receive a reward for his invention. Instead, Phalaris, who was disgusted by these words, ordered its horn sound system to be tested by Perilaus himself, tricking him into getting in the bull. When Perilaus entered, he was immediately locked in and the fire was set, so that Phalaris could hear the sound of his screams. Before Perilaus could die, Phalaris opened the door and took him away. After freeing him from the bull, Phalaris is then said to have taken Perilaus to the top of a hill and thrown him off, killing him. Phalaris himself is claimed to have been killed in the brazen bull when he was overthrown by Telemachus, the ancestor of Theron.

Legends
The Romans have been claimed to have used this torture device to kill some Christians, notably Saint Eustace, who, according to Christian tradition, was roasted in a brazen bull with his wife and children by Emperor Hadrian. The same happened to Saint Antipas, Bishop of Pergamon during the persecutions of Emperor Domitian and the first martyr in Asia Minor, who was roasted to death in a brazen bull in AD 92. The device is claimed to have still been in use two centuries later, when another Christian, Pelagia of Tarsus, is said to have been burned in one in AD 287 by the Emperor Diocletian.

See also
 Iron maiden
 Torture chamber
 Moloch

References
Notes

Bibliography

External links

Ancient instruments of torture
European instruments of torture
Execution methods
Brass instruments